The United Grand Lodge of England (UGLE) is the governing Masonic lodge for the majority of freemasons in England, Wales and the Commonwealth of Nations. Claiming descent from the Masonic grand lodge formed 24 June 1717 at the Goose & Gridiron Tavern in London, it is considered to be the oldest Masonic Grand Lodge in the world. Together with the Grand Lodge of Scotland, and the Grand Lodge of Ireland, they are often referred to by their members as "the home Grand Lodges" or "the Home Constitutions".

History

Moderns and Ancients in English Freemasonry

Prior to 1717 there were Freemasons' lodges in England, Scotland, and Ireland, with the earliest known admission of non-operative masons being in Scotland. On St John's Day, 24 June 1717, three existing London lodges and a Westminster lodge held a joint dinner at the Goose and Gridiron alehouse in St Paul's Churchyard, elected Anthony Sayer to the chair as Grand Master, and called themselves the Grand Lodge of London and Westminster. The City of London Corporation has erected a Blue Plaque near the location. Little is known of Sayer save that he was described as a Gentleman (a man of independent means) when he became Grand Master, but later fell on hard times, receiving money from the Grand Lodge charity fund.

In 1718 Sayer was succeeded by George Payne, a successful Civil Servant. The society then passed into the care of John Theophilus Desaguliers, a scientist and clergyman, then back to Payne. In 1721, the Grand Lodge managed to obtain a nobleman, the Duke of Montagu to preside as Grand Master, and so was able to establish itself as an authoritative regulatory body, and began meeting on a quarterly basis. This resulted in lodges outside London becoming affiliated, accepting sequentially numbered warrants conferring seniority over later applicants.

In 1723, by authority of the Grand Lodge, James Anderson published the Constitutions of Masonry for the purposes of regulating the craft and establishing the Grand Lodge's authority to warrant Lodges to meet. The book includes a fanciful history of the Craft, which nevertheless contains much interesting material.

Throughout the early years of the new Grand Lodge there were any number of Masons and lodges that never affiliated with the new Grand Lodge. These unaffiliated Masons and their Lodges were referred to as "Old Masons", or "St John Masons", and "St John Lodges".

During the 1730s and 1740s antipathy increased between the London Grand Lodge and the Grand Lodges of Ireland and Scotland. Irish and Scots Masons visiting and living in London considered the London Grand Lodge to have deviated substantially from the ancient practices of the Craft. As a result, these Masons felt a stronger kinship with the unaffiliated London Lodges. The aristocratic nature of the London Grand Lodge and its members alienated other Masons causing them also to identify with the unaffiliated Lodges.

On 17 July 1751, representatives of five Lodges gathered at the Turk's Head Tavern, in Greek Street, Soho, London and formed a rival Grand Lodge: "The Grand Lodge of England According to the Old Institutions". They considered that they practised a more ancient and therefore purer form of Masonry, and called their Grand Lodge The Ancients' Grand Lodge. They called those affiliated to the Premier Grand Lodge, by the pejorative epithet The Moderns. These two unofficial names stuck.

The creation of Lodges followed the development of the Empire, with all three home Grand Lodges warranting Lodges around the world, including the Americas, India and Africa, from the 1730s.

Formation of the United Grand Lodge of England

In 1809 the Moderns appointed a "Lodge of Promulgation" to return their own ritual to regularity with Scotland, Ireland and especially the Ancients. In 1811 both Grand Lodges appointed Commissioners; and over the next two years, articles of Union were negotiated and agreed upon. In January 1813 the Duke of Sussex became Grand Master of the Moderns on the resignation of his brother, the Prince Regent; and in December 1813 another brother, Duke of Kent became Grand Master of the Antients. On 27 December 1813 the United Grand Lodge of England ("UGLE") was constituted at Freemasons' Hall, London with the Duke of Sussex (younger son of King George III) as Grand Master. A Lodge of Reconciliation was formed to reconcile the rituals worked under the two former Grand Lodges.

The new Grand Master had high hopes for Freemasonry, having a theory that it was pre-Christian and could serve the cause of humanity as a universal religion. However, his autocratic dealings with ordinary lodges won him few friends outside London, and sparked open rebellion and a new Grand Lodge of Wigan in the North West. Within Grand Lodge, opposition centred on Masonic Charity. Robert Crucefix launched the Freemason's Quarterly Review to promote charity to keep Freemasons from the workhouse, and to engage masons in the broader argument for social reform. The Earl of Zetland's complacent and inept management of Grand Lodge played into the hands of the reformers, and by the end of the 1870s English Freemasonry had become a perfect expression of the aspirations of the enlightened middle classes.

Freemasonry in contemporary times
In response to conspiracy theories about Freemasons and generally hostile views gaining new life, due to the works of Stephen Knight and Martin Short, the United Grand Lodge of England began to change the way it dealt with the general public and the media from the mid-1990s, emphasizing a new "openness." This presentation was summed up by Provincial Secretary of East Lancashire, Alan Garnett who declared, "we're not a secret society or a society with secrets, but we are a private society." Lodges across England and Wales began holding open days, to allow the general public to see what they do. Freemasons' Hall, London and the Library and Museum of Freemasonry also opened to the general public, including guided tours.

Today, the United Grand Lodge of England or Grand Lodge currently has over 200,000 members meeting in over 6,800 Lodges, organised into a number of subordinate Provincial Grand Lodges which are approximately equivalent to the historic counties of England.

 Lodges meeting in London (an area generally within a 10-mile radius of Freemasons’ Hall) are, with five exceptions, administered by the Metropolitan Grand Lodge of London, headed by the Metropolitan Grand Master.
 Lodges meeting outside London, and within England, Wales, the Isle of Man and the Channel Islands, are grouped into 47 Provincial Grand Lodges (UGLE), each headed by a Provincial Grand Master.
 Lodges that meet outside England, Wales, the Isle of Man and the Channel Islands are grouped into 33 District Grand Lodges, each headed by a District Grand Master.
 Five Groups (i.e.: currently too small to make up a District), each headed by a Grand Inspector.
 Five Lodges in London and 12 Lodges abroad that are directly administered by Freemasons' Hall.

Grand Masters

 Prince Augustus Frederick, Duke of Sussex (1813–1843)
 Thomas Dundas, 2nd Earl of Zetland (1844–1870)
 George Robinson, 3rd Earl de Grey and 2nd Earl of Ripon (1st Marquess of Ripon from 1871) (1870–1874)
 Albert Edward, Prince of Wales (King of Great Britain and Ireland as Edward VII from 1901) (1874–1901)
 Prince Arthur, Duke of Connaught and Strathearn (1901–1939)
 Prince George, Duke of Kent (1939–1942)
 Henry Lascelles, 6th Earl of Harewood (1942–1947)
 Edward Cavendish, 10th Duke of Devonshire (1947–1950)
 Roger Lumley, 11th Earl of Scarbrough (1951–1967)
 Prince Edward, Duke of Kent (1967–present)

Pro Grand Masters
When the Grand Master is a member of the royal family it is customary to appoint a Pro Grand Master. The Pro Grand Master fills the role of the Grand Master when he is not available due to his royal duties. It is distinct from the Deputy Grand Master who acts as the Grand Master's deputy rather than as acting Grand Master.

Albert Edward, Prince of Wales
Henry Herbert, 4th Earl of Carnarvon (1874 to 1890)
Edward Bootle-Wilbraham, 1st Earl of Lathom (1891 to 1898)
William Amherst, 3rd Earl Amherst (1898 to 1901)

Prince Arthur, Duke of Connaught and Strathearn 
William Amherst, 3rd Earl Amherst (1901 to 1908)
Oliver Russell, 2nd Baron Ampthill (1908 to 1935)

Prince Edward, Duke of Kent 
William Cadogan, 7th Earl Cadogan (1969 to 1982)
Fiennes Cornwallis, 3rd Baron Cornwallis (1982 to 1991)
Barry Maxwell, 12th Baron Farnham (1991 to 2001)
Spencer Compton, 7th Marquess of Northampton (2001 to 2009)
Peter Lowndes (2009 to 2022)
Jonathan Spence (2022 to present)

Grand Secretaries 

 1891–1917: Sir Edward Letchworth (succeeding Colonel Shadwell H. Clarke)
 1917–1937: Sir Philip Colville Smith, CVO
 1937–1958: Sir Sydney Arthur White, KCVO
 1958–1980: Sir James Wilfrid Stubbs, KCVO, TD
 1980–1998: Commander Michael Bernard Shepley Higham, CVO

Opposition

Politics

In English politics, freemasonry has often been criticised by those associated with the Labour Party and trade unionism, because of a perception that freemasonry is aligned with the Conservative Party. The Labour Party became the second party of the United Kingdom from 1922 onward and stood on a platform of representing working-class interests, while the Conservatives and Liberals were largely based in the middle-class and upper-class (similar to Freemasonry). After a number of Labour MPs were blackballed from joining Masonic lodges, the Prince of Wales who was concerned by the potential conflict, intervened and had the New Welcome Lodge created for Labour members in 1929. Herbert Morrison claimed that his 1935 bid for the Labour leadership was sabotaged by Lodge members who preferred first Arthur Greenwood and then Clement Attlee.

Despite the creation of the New Welcome Lodge, there remained an element of hostility to Masonry within the Labour Party. As well as the alleged Tory connections, they accused Freemasonry of having unaccountable influence within the judicial system. This issue was brought to the forefront of English politics in the 1990s when Jack Straw, Home Secretary in the Tony Blair government attempted to force all Freemasons who worked as police officers, judges or magistrates to publicly declare membership in the organisation. In 2009, the ruling that freemasons had to declare if they were judges or magistrates was scrapped by Straw after fears that he would lose a court case at the European Court of Human Rights. Critics regard the group Common Purpose as an attempt to set up a pro-Labour freemasonry equivalent.

Conspiracy theories

As with freemasonry in other countries, the United Grand Lodge of England has featured as the subject of Masonic conspiracy theories; the most persistent of these attempts to link freemasonry to a "cover-up" or whitewash of the Jack the Ripper case (in some cases, conspiracy theorists have claimed that the killings were masonic ritual murder), the inquiry into the Sinking of the RMS Titanic (though Lord Mersey, Sydney Buxton and Lord Pirrie), and Bloody Sunday (though Lord Widgery).

In the Ripper case, Stephen Knight's Jack the Ripper: The Final Solution (1976) attempted to implicate freemasonry and the British royal family in the murders through the personage of the Duke of Clarence and Avondale. Elements of this theory, through the novel of Alan Moore and Eddie Campbell, even made its way into a major American film, From Hell (2001). The Hughes Brothers who produced the film, even approached the United Grand Lodge of England to get the "masonic bits" right, but, they were rebuffed due to the anti-masonic nature of the storyline. Another thesis, promoted by Bruce Robinson in his They All Love Jack (2015), attempts to link the case to freemasonry through Michael Maybrick.

Some native proponents of more generic anti-masonic conspiracy theories involving the Illuminati (based on John Robison and Augustin Barruel) have typically sought to implicate only Continental Freemasonry as a subversive force, while claiming to not be attacking the United Grand Lodge of England itself or British freemasonry more generally. This is the case with Nesta Helen Webster in her Secret Societies and Subversive Movements (1924). The American-born but English-domiciled Lady Queenborough pulled fewer punches with her Occult Theocrasy (1933), claiming that English freemasonry was founded as a front for the "Manichean" Rosicrucians. Many of these conspiracy theorists also attempted to implicate Jews or Jesuits as working hand in hand with masonry (such as Barry Domvile, coiner of the epithet "Judmas").

See also

 Freemasons' Hall, London
Museum of Freemasonry, London

References

Footnotes

Bibliography

External links
United Grand Lodge of England Homepage
The Library and Museum of Freemasonry
Freemasonry in the Police and the Judiciary by Home Affairs Select Committee

 
England
Organizations established in 1717
1717 establishments in England
International organisations based in London
Freemasonry in England
Supraorganizations